The Van Tienhoven cabinet was the cabinet of the Netherlands from 21 August 1891 until 9 May 1894. The cabinet was formed by the Liberal Union (LU) and Independent Liberals (I) after the election of 1891. The right-wing cabinet was a majority government in the House of Representatives. Independent Classical Liberal Gijsbert van Tienhoven was Prime Minister.

Cabinet Members

References

External links
Official

  Kabinet-Van Tienhoven Parlement & Politiek

Cabinets of the Netherlands
1891 establishments in the Netherlands
1894 disestablishments in the Netherlands
Cabinets established in 1891
Cabinets disestablished in 1894